Tsiniaris, is a circle Cretan folk dance from Agios Vasileios, Crete, Greece. It is usually danced by older local persons and is very widespread in Rethymno.

See also
Music of Greece
Greek dances

References
Ελληνικοί παραδοσιακοί χοροί: Τσινιάρης

Greek dances